Tarnvir Singh Jagpal is an Indian film director. He is known for his work in Punjabi Cinema. He made his directing debut with the movie Rabb Da Radio, for which he received a Filmfare Best Film (critics) Award.

Career 
Singh started his career as an assistant director with the movies Taur Mittran Di, Tu Mera 22 Main Tera 22, Romeo Ranjha, Rangeelay, Singh vs Kaur, Ishq Garaari and Saadi Love Story.

In 2017, he directed the movie Rabb Da Radio, for which he received a Filmfare Award. In 2018, he directed the movie Daana Paani.

Filmography

As a director

As a producer

Awards and nominations

References 

Living people
Punjabi-language film directors
Film directors from Punjab, India
21st-century Indian film directors
1995 births